Stephen Russell Reed (August 9, 1949 – January 25, 2020) was the longest-serving mayor of Harrisburg, Pennsylvania. Dubbed "Mayor-for-Life," he was re-elected to seven four-year terms, serving from 1982 to 2010. After leaving office, Reed faced charges on nearly 500 counts of theft, fraud and corruption.  He pled guilty to 20 charges and was sentenced to probation. Reed died on January 25, 2020, in Harrisburg at the age of 70, after a long battle with prostate cancer.

Biography 
Reed was born in Chambersburg, Pennsylvania. After moving to Harrisburg in the 1950s, Reed attended Bishop McDevitt High School, where he graduated in 1967.  He went on to attend Dickinson College and was named a Finnegan Fellow in 1970.  He did not graduate from Dickinson and later served as an emergency medical technician in Harrisburg, while pursuing his early political career.

Political life 
Active in the Democratic Party as a teenager, Reed headed the Teenage Democrats of Pennsylvania, was Vice-President of the College Young Democrats of Pennsylvania, and was active in many civic activities.  Among his early work experiences was a staff job for the Democratic Caucus in the Pennsylvania House of Representatives.

In the Democratic landslide victory year of 1974, when he was 25, Reed campaigned hard for the Pennsylvania House of Representatives, and upset four-term Republican incumbent George Gekas, who later became a Pennsylvania state senator and U.S. Congressman.  He would go on to serve three terms as a member of the state's House of Representatives until 1980.

As Mayor 
Re-elected to the state house in 1976 and 1978, Reed was elected Dauphin County, Pennsylvania Commissioner in 1979 and Mayor of Harrisburg in 1981.  He won re-election as mayor in 1985, 1989, 1993, 1997, 2001 and 2005. During the 2000s, he was considered "Pennsylvania's most popular and successful mayor."

During Reed's tenure, restaurants, museums, hotels, several large office buildings and new residences were constructed within the city limits. Reed was instrumental in the city getting its minor league baseball team, the Harrisburg Senators, and later led the city to purchase the team when it was sold to a buyer who intended to move it out of the region.

Harrisburg is also known worldwide for its use of land value taxation. Harrisburg has taxed land at a rate six times that on improvements since 1975, and this policy has been credited by Reed, as well as by the city's former city manager during the 1980s, with helping reducing the number of vacant structures in downtown Harrisburg from about 4,200 in 1982 to less than 500.

Reed is credited with conceiving and developing Harrisburg's City Island park, the Harrisburg University of Science and Technology, and the high school that accompanied it.  He is the founder and driving force behind the construction of the $32 million National Civil War Museum in the city.

In 2000, the Commonwealth of Pennsylvania placed Reed in charge of the failing Harrisburg School District, for which he imposed a massive reform and rehabilitation project. Most recently, in 2006 Reed was credited and recognized by the Federal Emergency Management Agency for reducing the city's flood risks.

Reed's successes are balanced by setback: population loss, mounting debt, and continued poverty remain challenges as Harrisburg's slow recovery continues. Those setbacks notwithstanding, in December 2006 the City Mayors organization recognized Reed's achievements by awarding him the bronze third place in its annual World Mayor competition.

Reed continued to bear strong criticism for purchases of historical Civil War and "American Old West" artifacts with public funds. The artifact purchases were intended for use in a planned Old West Museum, part of a larger plan by Reed to develop a "critical mass" of national and historically focused museums in Harrisburg, centered on the National Civil War Museum. Plans for the Old West Museum met strong public opposition and Reed placed the plans on hold, commissioning a public study (funded by an auction of some of the artifacts) to review the feasibility of the museum.

Reed faced similar criticism when acquiring artifacts for the National Civil War Museum. Opponents and critics are most critical about the methods Reed used to fund the purchases without public oversight: "Every time the independent Harrisburg Authority floats bonds for the Harrisburg school district and other government agencies, it collects a fee and deposits it into an account. The mayor can draw on that account for any capital expense as long as he has the signatures of two members of the authority (all appointed by the mayor)."

Reed won reelection in 2005, unopposed, after winning the Democratic Primary against Jason N. Smith, a Harrisburg entrepreneur and outspoken critic of the Old West Museum and artifact purchases.

As late as January 2009, he was called "Mayor-for-life." In the May 2009 Democratic Primary, Reed lost his re-election bid to Harrisburg City Council president Linda D. Thompson.

Corruption Indictment and conviction 
On July 14, 2015, Kathleen Kane, the Attorney General of the State of Pennsylvania, announced 499 criminal charges against Reed for his activities involving the museums and the incinerator project.  "This is one of the most disturbing cases of public corruption this office has investigated", Kane said. "Mayor Reed used taxpayer money to further his own interests. His conduct is at the root of the fiscal issues that continue to plague the city of Harrisburg today."

Reed was charged with diverting money from Harrisburg bond funds, including buying Wild West and Civil War memorabilia, some of which he hoarded in a private collection at his home, or sold for his own benefit. Noting his long tenure in office, Kane said as mayoral terms passed Reed came to disregard legal restraints on expenditures.

In response Reed said: "I devoted my life to the city of Harrisburg, and I look forward to waging a vigorous fight against these charges. There is much more to this story. It'll come out eventually. Just not today." Reed later said he had accidentally packed the items among his own when he left office.

The court dismissed 305 of the criminal charges for being beyond the statute of limitations. Reed pleaded guilty to 20 of the remaining felony and misdemeanor counts of receiving stolen property. He was given no jail time, instead sentenced to two years' probation and a fine.

See also

 List of mayors of Harrisburg

References

External links 
Biography of Mayor Stephen R. Reed
CityMayors.com profile
Stephen Reed nominated for the 2006 World Mayor Award

1949 births
2020 deaths
Mayors of Harrisburg, Pennsylvania
Democratic Party members of the Pennsylvania House of Representatives
Museum founders
People from Chambersburg, Pennsylvania
Pennsylvania politicians convicted of crimes
Pennsylvania politicians convicted of corruption
Dickinson College alumni
Criminals from Pennsylvania
21st-century American criminals